Shandi may refer to:

People
 Shandi Finnessey, Miss USA winner and game show host
 Shandi Mitchell, Canadian novelist
 Shandi Sinnamon, the American singer, songwriter

Places
 Shandi, Khuzestan, a village in Khuzestan Province, Iran
 Shendi the city of Shandi (or Shendi) in Sudan

Other uses
 "Shandi" (song), a song by the American hard rock band Kiss